Naidupeta mandal is one of the 34 mandals in Tirupati district of the state of Andhra Pradesh, India. Its headquarters are located at Naidupeta. The mandal is bounded by Balayapalle, Ojili, Pellakur, Doravarisatram and Chittamur mandals.

Demographics 

 census, the mandal had a population of 79,648. The total population constitute, 39,633 males and 40,015 females —a sex ratio of 1010 females per 1000 males. 7,979 children are in the age group of 0–6 years, of which 4,055 are boys and 3,924 are girls —a ratio of 968 per 1000. The average literacy rate stands at 72.77% with 52,150 literates.

Towns and villages 

Vinnamala is the most populated and Lankapalem is the least populated settlement in the mandal.  census, the mandal has 34 settlements, that includes the following towns and villages:

See also 
Tirupati district

References

Mandals in Tirupati district